Jade Anouka (born 12 June 1989) is an English actress. She is known for her various stage roles and for her appearances in His Dark Materials on BBC One and the ITV dramas Trauma and Cleaning Up.

Early life and education
Anouka was born in London, the second of three children born to a maths teacher mother from Trinidad and a mortgage advisor father from Jamaica. She has a brother and a sister who pursued careers in science. She grew up in Slade Green and attended school in Bexley, London, but transferred to a school in Lewisham for sixth form. She ran track prior to transferring to Lewisham, as she did not want to compete against her old teammates.

Anouka took her first steps into acting while attending a Saturday morning drama club in Dartford, Kent. While at sixth form, Anouka received a scholarship to the National Youth Theatre and then attended the Guildford School of Acting. She was hired immediately after graduation by the Royal Shakespeare Company in Stratford-upon-Avon, where she earned a postgraduate award in teaching Shakespeare.

Career
Anouka made her stage debut in 2007 with a role in Margaret Atwood's The Penelopiad. In 2011, she received a Commendation at the Ian Charleson Awards for her 2010 performance as Ophelia in Hamlet at Shakespeare's Globe.

Anouka had small television roles in Doctor Who (2013), Chewing Gum (2015), and Stan Lee's Lucky Man before getting a supporting role in the 2018 miniseries Trauma. She appeared in a 2020 episode (S9:E3) of Death in Paradise.

In 2014, she received the Stage Award for Acting Excellence for her one-woman show, Sabrina Mahfouz's Chef, at the Edinburgh Fringe Festival. In 2015, she brought the show to London for a week of special performances.

Anouka took part in Phyllida Lloyd's all-female Shakespeare trilogy, starring as Mark Antony in Julius Caesar  at the Donmar Warehouse, Hotspur in Henry IV at the Donmar Theatre, and Ariel in The Tempest at the King's Cross Theatre, and at Off-Broadway's St. Ann's Warehouse. She earned rave reviews for her roles in the three plays, which were broadcast on the BBC in 2018. In 2018, she also played Margaret of Anjou in Jeanie O'Hare's Queen Margaret, at the Royal Exchange, Manchester. She was named among the InStyle BAFTA Breakout Stars for 2018.

In 2019, Anouka appeared in Cleaning Up, a six-part drama on ITV and the Netflix series Turn Up Charlie.

In August 2020 she confirmed that she was to appear as Ruta Skadi in series two of the BBC/HBO fantasy drama His Dark Materials.

Anouka performs her poetry on stage, and in 2016, she published a volume of her poetry called Eggs on Toast.

In 2021, it was announced that Anouka will star alongside Jonathan Bailey, Taron Egerton and Phil Daniels in a production of Mike Bartlett’s Cock at the Ambassadors Theatre, London, in 2022.

Personal life
Anouka identifies as queer and/or bi. On 14 December 2021, Anouka announced that she had given birth to a daughter. In May 2022, Anouka married musician Grace Savage.

Filmography

Film

Television

Theatre

References

External links 
 
 
 

Living people
People from Bexleyheath
English people of Trinidad and Tobago descent
English people of Jamaican descent
21st-century English actresses
Black British actresses
English film actresses
English stage actresses
English television actresses
English Shakespearean actresses
21st-century English poets
English women poets
Actresses from London
Alumni of the Guildford School of Acting
Royal Shakespeare Company members
1989 births